The Slovenian Footballer of the Year  is an association football award presented annually by the Slovenian magazine EkipaSN.

Slovenian Footballer of the Year

Slovenian Youth Footballer of the Year

References

Association football player of the year awards by nationality
Slovenian awards

Annual events in Slovenia
Association football player non-biographical articles